Cattleya loddigesii is a species of orchid.

References

A comparison between C. harrisoniana and C. loddigesii

External links

loddigesii
loddigesii